Gighera is a commune in Dolj County, Oltenia, Romania with a population of 3,405 people. It is composed of three villages: Gighera, Nedeia and Zăval.

References

Communes in Dolj County
Localities in Oltenia